Macieira de Rates is a Portuguese parish, located in the municipality of Barcelos. The population in 2011 was 2,083, in an area of 7.85 km².

References

Freguesias of Barcelos, Portugal